The River Cywyn (Welsh Afon Cywyn) is a river that flows through Carmarthenshire, south Wales. It rises some seven miles west-north-west of Carmarthen and flows in a southerly direction to join the River Tâf near its estuary.

Cywyn